Lamont Jones (born July 3, 1972) is an American former professional basketball player who played the guard position. He played for Hapoel Gilboa/Afula in 2007-08, leading the Israeli Basketball Premier League in assists.

Personal life
Jones is from Brooklyn, New York. He is 6' 0" (183 cm) tall, and weighs 173 pounds (78 kg).  His younger brother Charles Jones led the NCAA in scoring in 1996-97 and 1997-98 for Long Island University, and played in the NBA for the Chicago Bulls and the Los Angeles Clippers.

Basketball career
Jones played high school basketball for Brooklyn Technical High School.

He played college basketball for the University of Bridgeport, graduating in 1995. He scored

2,019 Career Points. Averaged 20.8, 19.6, and 21.3 and at least 7 assists is final three years.  In 1993-95 Jones averaged 3.05 steals per game, at the time the 7th-highest steal career rate of any NCAA Division II player, and his 708 career assists were the 10th-most of any Division II player. He was a Division II second-team All-American in 1993, and a first-team All-American in 1995. In 2017, he was inducted into the University of Bridgeport Athletics Hall of Fame.

He started his professional career in 1995 with the Jersey Turnpikes of the United States Basketball League (USBL); he had other stints in that league from 1996 to 1998 with the Long Island Surf.

He played in the ABA in 1995 averaging 31 points and 9 assists per game.

He played for the Connecticut Pride of the Continental Basketball Association from 1996-98, averaging 8.2 points, 2.3 rebounds, and 4.0 assists per game in 49 games.

He won the CBA championship in 1999 averaging 19 points in the Playoffs.

Jones played for Hapoel Gilboa/Afula in 2007-08, leading the Israeli Basketball Premier League in assists with an average of 5.7 per game.

References

External links 
Career at Eurocupbasketball.com
CBA stats at Statscrew.com
Career stats at Proballers.com
Israeli league stats at Basket.co.il
https://basketball.eurobasket.com/player/Lamont-Jones/Bulgaria/Rilski-Sportist-Samokov/2029

1972 births
Living people
American expatriate basketball people in Bulgaria
American expatriate basketball people in Israel
American expatriate basketball people in Switzerland
American expatriate basketball people in Venezuela
American men's basketball players
Basketball players from New York City
Bridgeport Purple Knights men's basketball players
Brooklyn Technical High School alumni
Connecticut Pride players
Hapoel Galil Elyon players
Hapoel Gilboa/Afula players
Hapoel Jerusalem B.C. players
Ironi Ramat Gan players
Israeli Basketball Premier League players
PBC Academic players
Point guards
SAV Vacallo Basket players
Sportspeople from Brooklyn
Trotamundos B.B.C. players
United States Basketball League players